Cobalt 60 was an electro-industrial/EBM group featuring Jean-Luc de Meyer and Dominique Lallement. Cobalt 60 has also done music for the PC game Wing Commander: Prophecy (Wing Commander V).

Discography

Studio albums 
 Elemental (1996)
 Twelve (1998)

Singles 
 "Crush" (1996)
 "Born Again" (The Cubanate Remixes) (1996)
 "Prophecy – Wing Commander V : Prophecy Theme Single" (1997)
 "Prophecy – The Clubmixes" (1997)
 "It" (1998)
 "If I Was" (1999)

External links

References 

Electro-industrial music groups
Electronic body music groups